The Gande is a river of Lower Saxony, Germany. It is a right-hand tributary of the River Leine.

Course 
The Gande rises near the town of Lamspringe on the eastern side of the Sackwald in the county of Hildesheim and flows from there southwards between the Sackwald and the Heber ridges. It enters the district of Northeim near  (a subdivision of Bad Gandersheim). At Bad Gandersheim it turns west and empties into the Leine at Kreiensen.

See also
List of rivers of Lower Saxony

References

Rivers of Lower Saxony
Rivers of Germany